Palmer is an unincorporated community in Iosco Township, Waseca County, Minnesota, United States, near Waseca and Waterville.  The community is located along Waseca County Road 22 (410th Avenue) near 110th Street.

Palmer was platted in 1915.

References  

Unincorporated communities in Waseca County, Minnesota
Unincorporated communities in Minnesota